Tocache District is one of five districts of the province Tocache in Peru.

References

 Tocache Airport (SPCH)-Notams